Akhura may refer to:
 Akhurian River
 Axura, Azerbaijan